The 1996 European Men's Handball Championship was the second edition of the tournament and held in Spain from 24 May to 2 June 1996, in the cities of Ciudad Real and Seville. Russia won the tournament after defeating Spain in the final, while Yugoslavia finished third.

Teams

Venues

Preliminary round 
All times are local (UTC+2).

Group A

Group B

Placement games

Eleventh place game

Ninth place game

Seventh place game

Fifth place game

Knockout stage

Bracket

Semifinals

Third place game

Final

Ranking and Statistics

Final ranking

References 
 
 

E
Hand
European Men's Handball Championship
1996
May 1996 sports events in Europe
June 1996 sports events in Europe